Angelo Rinaldi (born 17 June 1940) is a French writer and literary critic.

Biography

Rinaldi is the son of Pierre-François Rinaldi and Antoinette Pietri; after growing up in Corsica he became a journalist. He initially worked as a reporter and court correspondent for the newspapers Nice-Matin and Paris-Jour and soon acquired a reputation as a writer and a sharp-penned literary critic.  As a critic, he worked for L'Express, Le Point and Le Nouvel Observateur before becoming literary editor of Le Figaro, which he remained until his retirement.

Rinaldi is Corsican, and his books often contain detailed observations of Corsica and of the town of Bastia where he grew up.

He has received the Prix Pierre de Monaco for his body of work.

He was elected to Seat 20 of the Académie Française on 21 June 2001, succeeding José Cabanis.

Bibliography

1969  La Loge du Gouverneur   (awarded the Fénéon Prize)
1971  La Maison des Atlantes  (Gallimard) 
1974  L'Éducation de l'oubli  (Denoël) 
1977  Les Dames de France  (Gallimard) 
1980  La Dernière Fête de l'Empire  (Gallimard) 
1985  Les Jardins du Consulat  (Gallimard) 
1987  Les Roses de Pline  (Gallimard) 
1990  La Confession des collines  (Gallimard) 
1993  Les jours ne s'en vont pas longtemps  (Grasset) 
1997  Dernières nouvelles de la nuit  (Grasset) 
1999  Service de presse. Chroniques  (Plon) 
2000  Tout ce que je sais de Marie  (Gallimard)

External links
  L'Académie française

1940 births
Living people
People from Bastia
French people of Corsican descent
20th-century French novelists
21st-century French novelists
Members of the Académie Française
French literary critics
Prix Femina winners
French LGBT novelists
French male novelists
Prix Fénéon winners
Prix Jean Freustié winners
20th-century French male writers
21st-century French male writers
French male non-fiction writers
21st-century LGBT people